Alex Sánchez Cruz (born July 20, 1930) is a former Costa Rican football player.

Biography 
He was born in Naranjo in Costa Rica's, Alajuela province. Sánchez started his soccer career at the early age of 10 playing in the Minor League for the Deportivo Saprissa. He started by training twice a day with the club and soon advanced to playing full-time. In 1945 he started in the first ever National Youth Championship, where he won a national title for the first time in his career.

By 1946 Saprissa had ascended to the Juvenile Division and Alex had become the starting goalkeeper. Saprissa won the Championship in the new division by beating the Liga Deportiva Alajuelense in a best-of-three series. The Championship allowed the Deportivo Saprissa, the Minor League branch of a Major League team named Orion F.C., to ascend to the Major Division. The team was renamed Orion F.C. and Sánchez was moved into the position of left wingback. He remained in this position until his retirement.

In 1947 Sánchez played in the Third Division for the newly renamed Orion F.C. and again was part of the team that won the Championship. This continued success prompted Ricardo Saprissa, the team's co-founder and namesake, to register the team in the Third Division of the Major League. That same year the Orion F.C. won the Championship, thus advancing to the Second Division, where the team was renamed back to the Deportivo Saprissa. The next season, the Deportivo Saprissa advanced one last time to the Primera Division, Costa Rica's top soccer league. Sánchez was part of the team that won the first three National Championship sin Costa Rica's top league in 1952, 1953 and 1957.

International career
By 1950 Sánchez had earned a spot on the Costa Rica national team. His debut was in the VI Juegos Centroamericanos y del Caribe played in Guatemala. In 1951 he was called once again to play for the National Team at the 1951 Pan American Games, in Argentina where they finished second place. Sánchez started for the national team in Honduras in 1955, where it would go to finished the tournament undefeated.

In 1956 Sánchez played with the Costa Rica national team at the third and last edition of the invitational Pan American Championship held in Mexico. During just one game he played in three different positions: left wingback, right wingback, and centre back. His versatility earned him the Most Valuable Player trophy.

In 1958 Sánchez participated in the qualifying matches for the 1958 FIFA World Cup held in Sweden. Costa Rica lost a best-of-two series against Mexico, and missed the chance to go on to participate in the FIFA World Cup. He earned a total of 32 caps, scoring no goals.

Highlights 
Costa Rica National Championship in 1952, 1953, and 1957 with the Deportivo Saprissa.
Champion at the Juegos Centroamericanos y del Caribe in 1955, 1959 and 1963 with the Costa Rica National Team.
Second place at the Pan American Games (Buenos Aires 1951) and third place at the Pan American Championship (Mexico City 1956) with the Costa Rica National Team.
World Soccer Tour in 1959 with the Deportivo Saprissa visiting Curaçao, Aruba, Venezuela, Portugal, the Netherlands, Austria, Italy, Israel, Thailand, Vietnam, Hong Kong, Philippines, Indonesia, Australia, New Zealand, Fiji, Hawaii, United States, and Mexico. The tour totaled 22 games and the Deportivo Saprissa finished the tour with a 14-1-7 record.
Part of the Chaparritos de Oro. The nickname was coined by the Mexican press.

Personal life
Sánchez married Sara Arroyo in March 1953. The couple had 4 children and 10 grandchildren. He currently resides in San José, Costa Rica.

References

External links 
 

1930 births
Living people
People from Naranjo (canton)
Association football forwards
Costa Rican footballers
Costa Rica international footballers
Deportivo Saprissa players
L.D. Alajuelense footballers
Liga FPD players